Baramati Assembly constituency is one of the 288 Vidhan Sabha (legislative assembly) constituencies of Maharashtra state in western India. It is one of the 21 constituencies located in the Pune district.

Baramati is part of the Baramati Lok Sabha constituency along with five other Vidhan Sabha constituencies in the Pune district, namely, Daund, Indapur, Purandar, Bhor and Khadakwasla.

Members of Legislative Assembly

^ bypoll

Results

2014

 

Deputy Chief Minister of Maharashtra, Ajit Pawar won the seat for 6th consecutive term.

2019

See also
 Baramati
 List of constituencies of Maharashtra Vidhan Sabha

References

Assembly constituencies of Pune district
Assembly constituencies of Maharashtra
Baramati